The Congo sunbird (Cinnyris congensis) is a species of bird in the family Nectariniidae.
It is found in Republic of the Congo and Democratic Republic of the Congo.

Taxonomy
Monotypic. Formerly considered part of the genus Nectarinia, along with other members of the genus Cinnyris.

Distribution and Habitat
Known from the Republic of Congo and the Democratic Republic of the Congo, where it occurs in riverine forests along the banks of the middle Congo River and its tributaries.

References

Congo sunbird
Birds of Central Africa
Congo sunbird
Congo sunbird
Taxonomy articles created by Polbot